Bishop of Tasmania may refer to:

Anglican Bishop of Tasmania
Archbishop of the Roman Catholic Archdiocese of Hobart